Paco de Lucía: La búsqueda is a Spanish documentary about the guitarist Paco de Lucía. It is directed by Francisco Sánchez Varela and portrayed by Paco de Lucía, who died before the production, Camarón de la Isla and Rubén Blades.

In 2015 it received a Goya Award for Best Documentary, and it was nominated for Platino Awards for Best Documentary. It got a Gold Record. It shows 29 themes music of the artist.

Cast

References

External links 
 
 Complete documentary on Documania TV.

Spanish documentary films
2014 films
Goya Award winners